The Wait is the second studio album by alternative rock band ZOX. It was originally released by Armo Records in 2005. After Zox was signed by SideOneDummy Records, the album was re-released on June 6, 2006.

Track listing
"The Wait"  – 0:31
"Thirsty"  – 2:37
"Carolyn"  – 4:50
"A Little More Time"  – 4:06
"Anything but Fine"  – 4:05
"Better if It's Worse"  – 3:03
"Bridge Burning"  – 5:44
"Big Fish"  – 5:07
"Can't Look Down"  – 3:32
"Satellite"  – 3:37
"Fallen"  – 5:14
"Spades"  – 4:57
"I Am Only Waiting"  – 4:16

There is also a hidden bonus track called "Vampire".

The singles from this album are "Can't Look Down", "Carolyn", and "Thirsty".

References

2005 albums
2006 albums
SideOneDummy Records albums
ZOX albums